Özdil is a Turkish word, and it may refer to:

Surname
Fitnat Özdil (1910–1993), Turkish female rower
Melek Özdil (born 1916), Turkish female rower
Nezihe Özdil (1911–1984), Turkish female rower
Özdil Nami (born 1967), Turkish-Cypriot politician

Turkish-language surnames